Kunming University 昆明学院, founded in 1984, is Yunnan's only comprehensive professional university approved by the Ministry of Education of the People's Republic of China.

Kunming University has 3 campuses with a total area of 499 mus.  The total value of teaching and scientific research equipment is 40,560,000 Yuan.  The university library collection stands out among the school's resources, containing more the 462,000 volumes.  In addition, the university has founded three training and experiment bases along with over 30 first-class laboratories, including the simulated tour guide laboratory, the security investment laboratory and the numerical control technology laboratory.

Rankings and reputation
Kunming University is ranked 4126 by 4icu world ranking and 6912 by Webometrics world ranking

Kunming University enrolls students from across China. At present, the student body is composed of over 7,000 students,  coming from 17 provinces, cities and autonomous regions. The university has 8 teaching units and 42 majors.  Among the majors offered, two are national model majors and six are provincial model majors.

It has a long-term student exchange agreement with Thonburi Rajabhat Thonburi, in Bangkok, Thailand and also with Shanghai Finance University.

Twin universities
 Environmental Campus Birkenfeld, Germany

References 
 https://web.archive.org/web/20080612191806/http://www.tech.net.cn/en/cu/10837.shtml

External links 
 http://www.kmu.edu.cn/

Universities and colleges in Kunming
Educational institutions established in 1984
1984 establishments in China